Sally-Ann Moffat (born 29 December 1964) is an Australian former cricketer who played as a right-arm medium bowler. She appeared in five Test matches and 15 One Day Internationals for Australia between 1987 and 1992. She played domestic cricket for New South Wales.

References

External links
 
 

1964 births
Living people
Cricketers from Sydney
Australian women cricketers
Australia women Test cricketers
Australia women One Day International cricketers
New South Wales Breakers cricketers